Ahmed Akaïchi (born 23 February 1989) is a Tunisian professional footballer who plays as a striker.

Club career
Akaïchi was born in Bizerte, Tunisia. Prior to the 2009–10 season, he played up front for Étoile du Sahel. On 22 August 2009, he scored four goals in one game against local rivals ES Hammam-Sousse in a 5–1 win. 

In the summer of 2011, Akaïchi left Tunisia and joined German second division club FC Ingolstadt 04.

During July 2015, Akaïchi went on trial with English Championship side Reading, but did not earn a contract.

In February 2022, returned to Lebanese Premier League club Ahed, ahead of the second leg of the 2021–22 season.

International career 
Akaïchi earned his first call up to the Tunisia national team when he was selected for the 2010 African Cup of Nations, held in Angola. 

Akaïchi represented Tunisia at the 2015 Africa Cup of Nations, scoring in a 1–1 draw with the Democratic Republic of the Congo to ensure that Tunisia qualified for the knockout stage.

After being named in Tunisia’s preliminary squad for the 2018 World Cup in Russia, he was one of six players to not make the final 23-man squad.

Career statistics

International
Scores and results list Tunisia's goal tally first, score column indicates score after each Akaïchi goal.

Honours
Espérance de Tunis
 Tunisian Ligue Professionnelle 1: 2013–14

Étoile du Sahel
 Tunisian Ligue Professionnelle 1: 2015–16

Al-Ittihad
 Crown Prince Cup: 2016–17
 King Cup: 2018

Ahed
 AFC Cup: 2019
 Lebanese Premier League: 2021–22
 Lebanese Super Cup: 2019

References

External links

 
 
 
 
 

1989 births
Living people
Tunisian footballers
Tunisian expatriate footballers
Tunisia international footballers
Association football forwards
Club Africain players
CA Bizertin players
Étoile Sportive du Sahel players
FC Ingolstadt 04 players
Ittihad FC players
Espérance Sportive de Tunis players
Ettifaq FC players
Al Ahed FC players
Al-Shahania SC players
Al Ahli SC (Doha) players
Kuwait SC players
Tunisian Ligue Professionnelle 1 players
2. Bundesliga players
Saudi Professional League players
Lebanese Premier League players
Qatar Stars League players
Kuwait Premier League players
2011 African Nations Championship players
2010 Africa Cup of Nations players
2015 Africa Cup of Nations players
2017 Africa Cup of Nations players
Expatriate footballers in Germany
Expatriate footballers in Saudi Arabia
Expatriate footballers in Lebanon
Expatriate footballers in Qatar
Expatriate footballers in Kuwait
Tunisian expatriate sportspeople in Germany
Tunisian expatriate sportspeople in Saudi Arabia
Tunisian expatriate sportspeople in Lebanon
Tunisian expatriate sportspeople in Qatar
Tunisian expatriate sportspeople in Kuwait
AFC Cup winning players
Tunisia A' international footballers
2016 African Nations Championship players